Col. Zadok Magruder High School (#510) is a secondary public school located in Rockville (Montgomery County), Maryland, United States.

Magruder is named for Colonel Zadok Magruder, a Revolutionary War patriot and farmer. He was colonel in command of part of the Maryland militia and helped establish Montgomery County's government in 1776.  The school is called simply "Magruder".

In 1971, the same student body became 9th, 10th and 11th graders. The first graduating class was the Class of 1973 and numbered approximately 300.

The building now totals .

Magruder has an International Studies Partnership with Hage Geingob High School in Windhoek, Namibia.

Athletics
2001 - Maryland 4A Basketball State Champions
2006 - men's varsity soccer team finished the regular season undefeated.
2007 Maryland 4A Men's Basketball Regional Champions and State Finalists
2007 - Maryland 4A Men's Soccer Regional and State Champions; went undefeated at 19–0; ranked in the Top 10 in the nation
2008 - Women's Metros Diving Champion Brittany Powell
2009 Women's Metros Diving Champion Brittany Powell
2010 - Maryland 4A West Field Hockey Regional Champions
2010 - Maryland 4A Boys' Soccer State Champions
2004 - 4A State Finalists (22-3 record); ranked #4 by the Washington Post
2009 - 4A State Finalists (24-1 record); ranked #7 by the Washington Post, #1 by the Gazette
2008 - 4A State Semifinalists (22-2 record); ranked #5 by the Washington Post, #2 by the Gazette
2010 - 4A State Champions; ranked 7th in the DC Metro Area
In 2007, the boys' soccer team went undefeated at 19-0 and won the 4A West Region Championship as well as the Maryland Class 4A State Title. In the same season, Magruder was ranked 7th nationally, and 1st in the DC Metro Area.

Notable alumni

Chris Carmack, actor
Sarah Cooper, comedian
Dan Hellie, sports broadcaster
Kelela, singer
Jason Kravits, actor
Courtney Kupets, Olympic gymnast
Helen Maroulis, Olympic wrestler
Pele Paelay, professional basketball player
John Stabb, singer
Milt Thompson, Major League Baseball player and coach
Jerome Williams, National Basketball Association (NBA) basketball player

References

External links

 

Public high schools in Montgomery County, Maryland
1970 establishments in Maryland
Schools in Rockville, Maryland
Educational institutions established in 1970